are two wrathful and muscular guardians of the Buddha standing today at the entrance of many Buddhist temples in East Asian Buddhism in the form of frightening wrestler-like statues. They are dharmapala manifestations of the bodhisattva Vajrapāṇi, the oldest and most powerful of the Mahayana Buddhist pantheon. According to scriptures like the Pāli Canon as well as the Ambaṭṭha Sutta, they travelled with Gautama Buddha to protect him. Within the generally pacifist tradition of Buddhism, stories of dharmapalas justified the use of physical force to protect cherished values and beliefs against evil. They are also seen as a manifestation of Mahasthamaprapta, the bodhisattva of power that flanks Amitābha in Pure Land Buddhism and as Vajrasattva in Tibetan Buddhism.

Manifestations

Symbolic meaning 

They are usually portrayed as a pair of figures that stand guarding temple entrance gates usually called Shānmén (山門) in China,  in Japan and Geumgangmun in Korea.  The right statue is traditionally called Guhyapāda and has his mouth open, representing the vocalization of the first grapheme of Sanskrit Devanāgarī (अ) which is pronounced "a". The left statue is traditionally called Nārāyaṇa and has his mouth closed, representing the vocalization of the last grapheme of Devanāgarī (ह ) which is pronounced "" (हूँ). These two characters together (a-hūṃ/a-un) symbolize the birth and death of all things. (Men are supposedly born speaking the "a" sound with mouths open and die speaking an "" and mouths closed.)  Similar to Jaya-Vijaya, they signify "everything" or "all creation". The contraction of both is Aum (ॐ), which is Sanskrit for The Absolute.

Guhyapāda 

Guhyapāda (Traditional Chinese: 密迹金剛; simplified Chinese: 密迹金刚; pinyin: Mìjī jīngāng; Japanese: Misshaku Kongō; Korean: Miljeok geumgang; Vietnamese: Mật tích kim cương ) is a symbol of overt violence: he wields a vajra mallet "" (a diamond club, thunderbolt stick, or sun symbol) and bares his teeth. His mouth is depicted as being in the shape necessary to form the "ha" or "ah" sound. In China, he is also known as General Ha (哈将 Hā Jiāng) in reference to this iconographic detail. Similarly, he is also known as Agyō (阿形, "a"-form, general term open-mouthed statues in aum pair) in Japan due to this detail as well. In Chinese Buddhism, Guhyapāda is regarded as one of the Twenty-Four Protective Deities, who are a grouping of dharmapalas often enshrined in the Mahavira Hall of temples and monasteries. In addition, Guhyapada is also sometimes paired or identified with the Wisdom King Ucchuṣma, who is commonly known in Chinese as Huìjì Jīngāng (穢跡金剛).

Nārāyaṇa 
Nārāyaṇa (Traditional Chinese: 那羅延金剛; simplified Chinese: 那罗延金刚; pinyin: Nàluōyán Jīngāng; Japanese: Naraen Kongō; Korean: Narayeon geumgang; Vietnamese: Na la diên kim cương) is depicted either bare-handed or wielding a sword. He symbolizes latent strength, holding his mouth tightly shut. His mouth is rendered to form the sound "", or "heng" or "un". In China, he is also known as General Heng (哼将 Hēng Jiāng) in reference to this iconographic detail. Similarly, he is also known as Ungyō (吽形, "um"-form, general term closed-mouthed statues in aum pair) in Japan due to this detail as well.

Vajrapāni 
Both Guhyapāda and Nārāyaṇa are seen as manifestations of Vajrapāni (Traditional Chinese: 執金剛神; simplified Chinese: 执金刚神; pinyin: Zhíjīngāng shén; Japanese: Shūkongōshin; Korean: Jip geumgang sin; Vietnamese: Chấp kim cang thần), with the name literally meaning "vajra-wielding god".

Nio Zen Buddhism
Nio Zen Buddhism was a practice advocated by the Zen monk Suzuki Shōsan (1579–1655), who advocated Nio Zen Buddhism over Nyorai Zen Buddhism. He recommended that practitioners should meditate on Nio and even adopt their fierce expressions and martial stances in order to cultivate power, strength and courage when dealing with adversity. Suzuki described Nio as follows: "The Niō (Vajrapani) is a menacing God. He wields the kongōsho (vajra) and he can crush your enemies. Depend on him, pray to him that he will protect you as he protects the Buddha. He vibrates with energy and spiritual power which you can absorb from him in times of need."

Influence on Taoism
In Chinese folk religion and Taoism, they are known as Heng Ha Er Jiang. Within the Taoist novel Fengshen Yanyi, Zheng Lun and Chen Qi were finally appointed as the two deities.

Hellenistic influence
Kongōrikishi are a case of the transmission of the image of the Greek hero Heracles to East Asia along the Silk Road. Heracles was used in Greco-Buddhist art to represent Vajrapani, the protector of the Buddha, and his representation was then used in China and Japan to depict the protector gods of Buddhist temples. This transmission is part of the wider Greco-Buddhist syncretic phenomenon, where Buddhism interacted with the Hellenistic culture of Central Asia from the 4th century BC to the 4th century AD.

Gallery

See also
 Buddhist and Greco-Buddhist art
List of Buddhist architecture in China
 Buddhist temples in Japan
 Door gods, for similar protective East Asian deities
Heng and Ha
 Greco-Buddhism
 Jaya-Vijaya
 Korean Buddhism
 Vajrapani and Skanda
 Om
 Ox-Head and Horse-Face
 Lugal-irra and Meslamta-ea
 Castor and Pollux
 Alexiares and Anicetus, twin-sons of Heracles/Hercules and Hebe/Juventas; alongside their father, they are the guardians of the gates of Mount Olympus.  
 Janus

Notes

References
 Religions of the Silk Road by Richard Foltz, 2nd edition (Palgrave, 2010) 
 The Diffusion of Classical Art in Antiquity by John Boardman (Princeton University Press, 1994) 
 Old World Encounters. Cross-cultural contacts and exchanges in pre-modern times by Jerry H.Bentley (Oxford University Press, 1993) 
 Alexander the Great: East-West Cultural contacts from Greece to Japan (NHK and Tokyo National Museum, 2003)

External links

Nio Protectors, the benevolent kings

Bodhisattvas
Buddhist gods
Chinese gods
Japanese gods
Buddhism in Japan
Buddhism in Korea
Heracles
Japanese architectural features
Buddhist architecture
Twenty-Four Protective Deities